is a private Junior College in Asakita-ku, Hiroshima, Japan.

The college was renamed to Hiroshima Bunkyo Women's Junior College in 2001 when it began offering degree qualifications.

Educational institutions established in 1962
Japanese junior colleges
Private universities and colleges in Japan
Universities and colleges in Hiroshima Prefecture
1962 establishments in Japan